Maestros is Orquesta El Arranque's fifth album. It received a nomination for the Premios Gardel in 2005.

Track listing

Personnel
Camilo Ferrero (First Bandoneon)
Ramiro Boero (Second Bandoneon)
Ramiro Gallo (First Violin)
Pedro Pablo Pedroso (Second Violin)
Martín Vázquez (Electric Guitar)
Ignacio Varchausky (Double Bass)
Ariel Rodríguez (Piano)
Ariel Ardit (voice)
Raúl Garello (invited maestro)
Mauricio Marcelli (invited maestro)
Néstor Marconi (invited maestro)
Julio Pane (invited maestro)

References

2005 albums
Orquesta El Arranque albums